The red cabbage (purple-leaved varieties of Brassica oleracea Capitata Group) is a kind of cabbage, also known as Blaukraut after preparation. Its leaves are colored dark red/purple. However, the plant changes its color according to the pH value of the soil due to a pigment belonging to anthocyanins. In acidic soils, the leaves grow more reddish; in neutral soils, they will grow more purple, while an alkaline soil will produce rather greenish-yellow colored cabbages. This explains the fact that the same plant is known by different colors in various regions. It can be found in all of Europe, throughout the Americas, in China, and especially in Africa.

The juice of red cabbage can be used as a homemade pH indicator, turning red in acid and green/yellow in basic solutions. When cooking, red cabbage will normally turn blue; adding vinegar or acidic fruit to the pot is necessary to retain the cabbage's red color.

Red cabbage needs well-fertilized soil and sufficient humidity to grow. It is a seasonal plant that is seeded in spring and harvested in late autumn. Red cabbage is a better keeper than its "white" relatives and does not need to be converted to sauerkraut to last the winter.

Uses

Red cabbage is often used raw for salads and coleslaw. This vegetable can be eaten cooked. It is the traditional accompanying side dish paired with many German meals, notably meat dishes like Sauerbraten or Döner. At Christmas, it can be spiced, braised, and served as an accompaniment to seasonal roast goose or turkey. Often apples are added to give it a sweet-sour taste.

Cultivation

It is recommended to start red cabbage seeds indoors four weeks before the last frost. Sow in containers that allow for the movement of water through the bottom of a cell. Popular seedling starting containers are peat pots, egg cartons, plug trays, or milk cartons. Red cabbage prefers climates that remain moist and cool for most of its vegetative growth stage, so it can be placed in the ground shortly after the last frost while the spring is still cool. They will need watering often but are otherwise low-maintenance plants.

pH indicator

Red cabbage contains an anthocyanin-based dye that can be used as a pH indicator. It is red, pink, or magenta in acids (pH < 7), purple in neutral solutions (pH ≈7), and ranges from blue to green to yellow in alkaline solutions (pH > 7).

Nutrition

Cooked red cabbage is 91% water, 7% carbohydrates, 1% protein, and contains negligible fat (table). It has a high content of vitamin C and vitamin K, containing 44% and 72%, respectively, of the Daily Value (DV) per 100-gram amount, and is a moderate source of vitamin B6 (17% DV) (table).

Phytochemicals
Red cabbage phytochemicals include sulforaphane and other glucosinolates.

References

External links

 How to Make Red Cabbage pH Indicator
 How to extract the dye

Cabbage
Leaf vegetables